Raffaella Morganti (born 19 September 1958) is an Italian astrophysicist and radio astronomer. Her primary research interests are radio observations of active galaxies. She was head of the Astronomy group of ASTRON from 2007-2014 (succeeded by Michael Wise), and is currently a Senior Astronomer at ASTRON. She is also Professor of Astronomy at the University of Groningen's Kapteyn Institute.

Morganti was honored as a Commander in the Order of the Star of Italy in 2014.

References 

1958 births
21st-century Italian physicists
21st-century Italian women scientists
Living people
Italian astrophysicists
21st-century Italian astronomers
Italian women physicists
Italian expatriates in Germany
Italian expatriates in the Netherlands
Academic staff of the University of Groningen
Women astrophysicists
Women astronomers